Breitbart is a surname of German or Yiddish origin, meaning "broad beard" in both languages. Notable people with the surname include:

Andrew Breitbart (1969–2012), American web publisher and news commentator
William Breitbart (born 1951), American psychiatrist
Zishe Breitbart (1883–1925), Polish-Jewish circus strongman